Carania District is one of thirty-three districts of the province Yauyos in Peru.

See also 
 Kiwyu
 Llunk'uti
 Wamanmarka

References